Men's Giant Slalom and Super G World Cup 1983/1984

Calendar

Final point standings

In Men's Giant Slalom and Super G World Cup 1983/84 the best 5 results count.

References
 fis-ski.com

World Cup
FIS Alpine Ski World Cup men's giant slalom discipline titles
FIS Alpine Ski World Cup men's Super-G discipline titles